Yuri Kim (born c. 1972) is a South Korean-born U.S. diplomat serving as the United States Ambassador to Albania since 2020. Kim is the first Korean-American woman to represent the United States as an Ambassador and the first U.S. ambassador from Guam.

Early life and education
Kim was born in South Korea in 1972. Kim's father is Kenneth Tae-Rang Kim, the founder of Yury Construction Co., and her mother was Jane Wha-Young Kim, a homemaker and community leader.
In 1976, at age four, Kim and her family immigrated to Guam. Her mother was among 228 passengers who perished on Korean Air Flight 801, which crashed on Guam on Aug. 6, 1997. Her family established the Jane Wha-Young Kim Foundation in her memory, providing scholarships to high school and university students on Guam as well as an award for outstanding teachers. Kim graduated from the Academy of Our Lady of Guam. She then earned a B.A. from the University of Pennsylvania and an M.Phil. from University of Cambridge. In addition to English she speaks Korean, Mandarin, Japanese, and Turkish.

Career

Kim is a career member of the Senior Foreign Service. Kim served as the Director of the State Department's Center for the Study of Diplomacy, Chief of Staff to the Deputy Secretary of State, and Director of the Office of European Security and Political-Military Affairs. Kim served as the Director of the Office of Southern European Affairs in the State Department's Bureau of European and Eurasian Affairs from 2018-19.

Earlier in her career, Kim served as Special Assistant to the Assistant Secretary of State for East Asian and Pacific Affairs and was a member of the American delegation to the Six-Party Talks focused on ending North Korea’s nuclear weapons program. She was also a Special Assistant to Secretary of State Colin Powell.

Kim was confirmed as Ambassador to Albania by a voice vote of the full Senate on December 19, 2019, and presented her credentials to Albanian President Ilir Meta in Tirana on January 27, 2020. During her diplomatic mission in Albania, Yuri Kim is supporting the growth of American investments in Albania.

Personal life
Kim speaks Korean, Mandarin Chinese, Japanese, Turkish, as well as English.

See also

List of ambassadors of the United States

References

Living people
Date of birth missing (living people)
21st-century American diplomats
Alumni of the University of Cambridge
Ambassadors of the United States to Albania
South Korean emigrants to the United States
Guamanian people of Korean descent
Trump administration personnel
University of Pennsylvania alumni
United States Department of State officials
United States Foreign Service personnel
American women ambassadors
21st-century American women
Year of birth missing (living people)
American women diplomats